Nils Lagerlöf (born August 14, 1995) is a Swedish former professional ice hockey defenceman. He last played for the Kallinge-Ronneby IF of the Hockeyettan.

Lagerlöf made his Swedish Hockey League debut playing with Frölunda HC during the 2014–15 SHL season.

References

External links

1995 births
Frölunda HC players
Living people
Swedish ice hockey defencemen
People from Karlskrona
Sportspeople from Blekinge County